Kuqishtë is a small village located in the municipality of Peja, Kosovo. Kuqishtë is located near the Montenegro border, at the edge of the Rugova Canyon in the Prokletije range. The Peja Bistrica flows past the village. The peak of Leqinat at 1,799 meters above sea level is situated to the west of the village. The village of Kuqishtë is categorized as being the last village in the Rugova Canyon and for the rough terrain it's on.

The lake on Leqinat mountain bears the name of the village although the lake is also called Leqinat lake.

Notes

References

Villages in Peja
Accursed Mountains